Siddhesh Warghante (born 22 December 1998) is an Indian cricketer. He made his first-class debut for Maharashtra in the 2018–19 Ranji Trophy on 7 January 2019.

References

External links
 

1998 births
Living people
Indian cricketers
Maharashtra cricketers
Place of birth missing (living people)